The Slovenian Alpine Museum is a mountaineering museum in Mojstrana in the vicinity of Triglav National Park (Julian Alps) in northwestern Slovenia. It was opened on 7 August 2010 by the president of Slovenia, Danilo Türk. It is operated by the Jesenice Upper Sava Museum.

References

External links
 Slovenian Alpine Museum homepage

Museums in Slovenia
Museum
Municipality of Kranjska Gora
Buildings and structures completed in 2010
21st-century architecture in Slovenia